is a former Japanese football player and manager. He is the currently manager of Japan Football League club, Briobecca Urayasu. He played for Japan national team. His son Yuta Tsunami is also a footballer currently play in Nara Club.

Club career
Tsunami was a product of Yomiuri (later Verdy Kawasaki) youth system. He joined Japan Soccer League side Yomiuri in 1980. The club won the champions in Japan Soccer League 5 times, JSL Cup 3 times and Emperor's Cup 3 times. This was golden era in club history. He was also selected Best Eleven 3 times (1982, 1983 and 1984). In 1992, Japan Soccer League was folded and founded new league J1 League. However he lost opportunity to play after that. Toward the end of his career, he played for Avispa Fukuoka (1996–1997) and Bellmare Hiratsuka (1997–1998). He retired in 1998. He played 267 games and scored 5 goals in the league.

National team career
Tsunami was capped 78 times and scored 2 goals for the Japanese national team between 1980 and 1995. He made his first international appearance on 22 December 1980 in a 1982 World Cup qualification against Singapore in Hong Kong. He scored his first international goal on 20 September 1986 in an Asian Games match against Nepal in Daejeon, South Korea. After 1988 Summer Olympics qualification in 1987, he ceased to be selected Japan.

In May 1992, Tsunami was selected Japan for the first time in 5 years. He was a member of the Japan team that won the 1992 Asian Cup. He played all the Japan games except one for which he wasn't eligible due to suspension.

He was such a key player that national coach Hans Ooft named him a member of the Japan squad for the 1994 World Cup qualification stage for the 1994 World Cup in spite of his injury. However, he could not play any game in the competition that was centrally held in Doha, Qatar as his recovery wasn't as good as Ooft had wished it to be. Japan's hope to qualify for the finals was dashed by a stoppage time Iraqi equaliser in the last qualifying match. The Japanese fans now refer to this match as the Agony of Doha, and his absence was one of the main reasons why Japan's campaign ended up unsuccessful.

Coaching career
After finishing his playing career, Tsunami worked as a pundit on television and as a coach at Tokyo Verdy's youth setup. He acquired the S-Class Coaching License that was a prerequisite to manage a J.League club in 2004.

In 2005, he was appointed the manager of J2 League side Vegalta Sendai. Vegalta finished fourth and failed to gain the promotion. Tsunami was dismissed after one season. In 2006, he became an assistant coach to new manager Ruy Ramos at another J2 side Tokyo Verdy. Again the team failed to move up and he was sacked after one season. In 2007, he became the manager of newly relegated J2 side Cerezo Osaka but was dismissed in May after a bad start.

In 2008, he was appointed as the manager of J2 League club Yokohama FC but was fired at the end of the 2008 season.

Club statistics

National team statistics

Managerial statistics

Honours and awards

Team honors
 1992 Asian Cup (Champions)

References

External links
 
 
 Japan National Football Team Database
 
 

1961 births
Living people
Association football people from Tokyo
Japanese footballers
Japan Soccer League players
J1 League players
Tokyo Verdy players
Avispa Fukuoka players
Shonan Bellmare players
Japan international footballers
1992 AFC Asian Cup players
1995 King Fahd Cup players
AFC Asian Cup-winning players
Japanese football managers
J2 League managers
Vegalta Sendai managers
Cerezo Osaka managers
Yokohama FC managers
Footballers at the 1982 Asian Games
Footballers at the 1986 Asian Games
Association football defenders
Asian Games competitors for Japan